Ashok Kumar Khajuria is an Indian politician and member of the Bharatiya Janata Party. Khajuria was a member of the Jammu and Kashmir Legislative Assembly from the Jammu East constituency in Jammu district. He was also Member of J&K legislative council.

References 

People from Jammu district
Bharatiya Janata Party politicians from Jammu and Kashmir
Jammu and Kashmir MLAs 1996–2002
Living people
21st-century Indian politicians
Politicians from Jammu
Year of birth missing (living people)